Paul McGrath (born 13 February 1948) is a former Irish Fine Gael politician. He was a Teachta Dála (TD) for Longford–Westmeath and Westmeath constituencies from 1989 to 2007.

McGrath, a native of Ballymore, County Westmeath was educated at St Finian's College, Mullingar and at Leeds Trinity and All Saints College. Prior to entering national politics, he worked as a primary schoolteacher in County Westmeath.

Paul McGrath was first elected to Dáil Éireann at the 1989 general election as a Fine Gael candidate in the Longford–Westmeath constituency, replacing the retiring Fine Gael TD, Patrick Cooney. He retained his seat in all subsequent elections, which since the 1992 general election has been part of the Westmeath constituency. In 1991, he was elected as a member of Westmeath County Council and Mullingar Town Council, and was a member of both bodies until his retirement from local politics in 2002.

In Dáil Éireann, he served as Fine Gael spokesperson on Public Works from 1993 to 1994 and as front bench spokesperson on Education in 1994, while Fine Gael were in opposition. During Fine Gael's period in government between 1995 and 1997, he was not appointed as a senior or junior minister, but was chairperson of the Joint Oireachtas Committee on the Family between 1995 and 1997.

In 1993 McGrath spoke against the decriminalisation of homosexuality. In the debate he remarked that "if this Bill is passed, I am concerned about the possible effect on Irish society. Will we now see exhibitions in public by homosexuals holding hands, kissing, cuddling, etc? Is homosexual behaviour to be put on a par with heterosexual behaviour?".

In the 29th Dáil elected in 2002, he was a member of the Joint Oireachtas Committee on Finance  and the Committee on the Houses of the Oireachtas, as well as being Fine Gael's deputy spokesperson on Finance.

In 2005, his Westmeath constituency was re-constituted into the new Longford–Westmeath constituency.  In an unexpected move, McGrath retired at the 2007 general election. Among the reasons cited were his age, his dissatisfaction with Fine Gael's proposed candidate selection strategy in the new constituency, and that he felt it unlikely that he would be chosen as a minister if Fine Gael were returned to government.

References

 

1948 births
Living people
Fine Gael TDs
Members of the 26th Dáil
Members of the 27th Dáil
Members of the 28th Dáil
Members of the 29th Dáil
Local councillors in County Westmeath
Irish schoolteachers
Alumni of Leeds Trinity University
People educated at St Finian's College